The 2010–11 NBL season was the 8th season for the New Zealand Breakers in the NBL. In this season, the Breakers won their first NBL championship title, becoming the first New Zealand first-grade team in any sport to win an Australian-based sporting championship.

Off-season

Additions

Subtractions

New Zealand also re-signed Kevin Braswell for the season.

Roster

Depth chart

Regular season

Standings

Game log

|- style="background-color:#bbffbb;"
| 1
| 10 October
| NZNBL Invitational
| W 98-53
|  
| 
| 
| North Shore Events Centre
| 1–0

|- style="background-color:#bbffbb;"
| 1
| 16 October
| @ Sydney
| W 83-70
| 
|
|
| Sydney Entertainment Centre  8,533
| 1–0
|- style="background-color:#bbffbb;"
| 2
| 20 October
| Perth
| W 96-94
| 
|
|
| North Shore Events Centre  2,280
| 2-0
|- style="background-color:#bbffbb;"
| 3
| 28 October
| Melbourne
| W 84-79
| 
|
|
| North Shore Events Centre  2,428
| 3-0

|- style="background-color:#bbffbb;"
| 4
| 6 November
| @ Gold Coast
| W 96-81
| 
|
|
| Gold Coast Convention Centre  3,871
| 4-0
|- style="background-color:#bbffbb;"
| 5
| 12 November
| @ Adelaide
| W 82-78
| 
|
| 
| Adelaide Arena  5,430
| 5-0
|- style="background-color:#ffcccc;"
| 6
| 14 November 
| @ Perth 
| L 74-114 
| 
| 
| 
| Challenge Stadium  4,200 
| 5-1 
|- style="background-color:#ffcccc;"
| 7
| 19 November
| Wollongong
| L 57-73
| 
|
|
| North Shore Events Centre  3,800
| 5-2
|- style="background-color:#bbffbb;"
| 8
| 25 November
| Gold Coast
| W 100-97
| 
|
|
| North Shore Events Centre  2,800
| 6-2

|- style="background-color:#bbffbb;"
| 9
| 5 December
| @ Sydney Kings
| W 94-80
| 
|
|
| Sydney Entertainment Centre  4,327
| 7-2
|- style="background-color:#bbffbb;"
| 10
| 9 December
| Cairns
| W 93-79
| 
|
|
| North Shore Events Centre  3,600 
| 8-2
|- style="background-color:#bbffbb;"
| 11
| 17 December
| @ Wollongong
| W 89-85
|  
| 
| 
| WIN Entertainment Centre  3,367 
| 9-2
|- style="background-color:#bbffbb;"
| 12
| 18 December
| @ Melbourne
| W 90-80
|  
| 
| 
| State Netball and Hockey Centre 3,356
| 10-2
|- style="background-color:#ffcccc;"
| 13
| 31 December
| @ Townsville
| L 79-96
|  
| 
| 
| Townsville Entertainment Centre  4,610
| 10-3
|-

|- style="background-color:#bbffbb;"
| 14
| 8 January
| @ Adelaide 36ers
| W 90-85
| 
|
|
| Adelaide Arena  5,261
| 11-3
|- style="background-color:#bbffbb;"
| 15
| 13 January
| Cairns Taipans
| W 94-88
| 
|
|
| North Shore Events Centre  4,148
| 12-3
|- style="background-color:#bbffbb;"
| 16
| 20 January
| Adelaide 36ers
| W 91-77
| 
|
|
| North Shore Events Centre  TBA
| 13-3
|- style="background-color:#bbffbb;"
| 17
| 30 January
| @Cairns Taipans
| W 77-74
| 
|
|
| Cairns Convention Centre  5,019
| 14-3

|- style="background-color:#bbffbb;"
| 18
| 3 February
| Wollongong Hawks
| W 80-76
| 
|
|
| North Shore Events Centre  TBA
| 15-3
|- style="background-color:#bbffbb;"
| 19
| 11 February
| Melbourne Tigers
| W 101-91
| 
|
|
| North Shore Events Centre  TBA 
| 16-3
|- style="background-color:#bbffbb;"
| 20
| 17 February
| Perth Wildcats
| W 82-79
| 
|
|
| North Shore Events Centre  2,634
| 17-3
|- style="background-color:#bbffbb;"
| 21
| 20 February
| @Gold Coast Blaze
| W 123-115
| 
|
|
| Gold Coast Convention Centre  TBA
| 18-3
|- style="background-color:#ffcccc;"
| 22
| 24 February
| Gold Coast Blaze
| L 91-94 
| 
|
|
| North Shore Events Centre  TBA
| 18-4
|- style="background-color:#ffcccc;"
| 23
| 27 February
| @Wollongong Hawks
| L 81-104
| 
|
|
| WIN Entertainment Centre  3,112
| 18-5

|- style="background-color:#bbffbb;"
| 24
| 3 March
| Townsville Crocodiles
| W 66-65
| 
|
|
| North Shore Events Centre  TBA
| 19-5
|- style="background-color:#ffcccc;"
| 25
| 12 March
| @Townsville Crocodiles
| L 92-100 
| 
|
|
| Townsville Entertainment Centre  4,086
| 19-6
|- style="background-color:#bbffbb;"
| 26
| 17 March
| Sydney Kings
| W 91-86
| 
|
|
| North Shore Events Centre  TBA
| 20-6
|- style="background-color:#bbffbb;"
| 27
| 30 March
| Adelaide 36ers
| W 100-71
| 
|
|
| North Shore Events Centre  3,500
| 21-6

|- style="background-color:#bbffbb;"
| 28
| 2 April
| @Melbourne Tigers
| W 87-74
| 
|
|
| State Netball and Hockey Centre  3,450
| 22-6
|-

Semi-finals

|- style="background-color:#ffcccc;"
| 1
| 7 April
| Perth Wildcats
| L 78-101
| 
|
|
| North Shore Events Centre  4,000
| 0–1
|- style="background-color:#bbffbb;"
| 2
| 10 April
| @Perth Wildcats
| W 93-89
| 
|
|
| Challenge Stadium  4,400
| 1-1
|- style="background-color:#bbffbb;"
| 3
| 13 April
| Perth Wildcats
| W 99-83
| 
|
|
| North Shore Events Centre  4,148
| 2-1
|-

Grand Finals

|- style="background-color:#bbffbb;"
| 1
| 20 April
| Cairns Taipans
| W 85-67
| 
|
|
| North Shore Events Centre  4,400
| 1–0
|- style="background-color:#ffcccc;"
| 2
| 24 April
| @Cairns Taipans
| L 81-85 
| 
|
|
| Cairns Convention Centre  5,200
| 1-1
|- style="background-color:#bbffbb;"
| 3
| 29 April 
| Cairns Taipans
| W 71-53
| 
|
|
| North Shore Events Centre  4,400
| 2-1
|-

Player statistics

Regular season

Finals

Awards

Player of the Week
 Week 4 – Gary Wilkinson
 Week 9 – Kirk Penney
 Week 10 – Kirk Penney
 Week 14 – Kirk Penney
 Week 19 – Kirk Penney
 Week 25 – Thomas Abercrombie

Player of the Month
 December – Kirk Penney
 January – Gary Wilkinson
 February – Kirk Penney

Coach of the Month
 January – Andrej Lemanis

All-NBL First Team
 Kirk Penney
 Gary Wilkinson

Most Valuable Player (Finals Series)
 Thomas Abercrombie

See also
2010–11 NBL season

References

External links
 New Zealand Breakers official website

2010–11 NBL season by team
2010-11
Breakers
Breakers